Aaron Charles Carter (December 7, 1987November 5, 2022) was an American singer and rapper. He came to fame as a teen pop singer in the late 1990s, establishing himself as a star among preteen and teenage audiences during the first years of the 21st century, with his four studio albums.

Carter began performing at age seven, after the formation of his brother Nick's group the Backstreet Boys, and released his self-titled debut album in 1997 at age nine, selling a million copies worldwide. His second album Aaron's Party (Come Get It) (2000) sold three million copies in the United States, and Carter began making guest appearances on Nickelodeon and touring with the Backstreet Boys shortly after the record's release. Carter's next album, Oh Aaron, also went platinum, and in 2002 he released what would be his last studio album in over 15 years, Another Earthquake!, followed by his 2003 Most Requested Hits collection.

Carter appeared on Dancing with the Stars, and in the Broadway musical Seussical and the off-Broadway musical The Fantasticks, and made several one-off performances. In 2014, he released a single featuring rapper Pat SoLo, "Ooh Wee". Carter released the single "Fool's Gold" in 2016, and an EP titled Love in 2017. His fifth studio album, also titled Love, was released in 2018. A sixth and final album, Blacklisted, was released two days after his death.

Early life
Aaron Charles Carter was born on December 7, 1987, in Tampa, Florida. His parents, Jane Elizabeth (née Spaulding) and Robert Gene Carter (1952–2017), ran a retirement home. He had an older brother, Nick, a member of the Backstreet Boys, and three sisters: his twin, Angel, a model; Bobbie Jean (BJ); and Leslie (1986–2012). The family was originally from Jamestown, New York. His parents divorced in 2004. Carter was told about the divorce an hour before he filmed his MTV Cribs episode.

Carter attended the Frank D. Miles Elementary School and the Ruskin School in Florida.

Career

1997–1999: Music beginnings and self-titled debut album
Carter began his career as the lead singer of Dead End. He left the band after two years because he wanted to perform pop music, while the other members were interested in alternative rock.

Carter made his first solo appearance at age 9, singing The Jets' "Crush on You" when opening for the Backstreet Boys in Berlin in March 1997. The performance was followed by a record contract, and in the fall of 1997, he released his first single "Crush on You". Carter's self-titled debut studio album was released on December 1, 1997. The album achieved gold status in Norway, Spain, Denmark, Canada, and Germany, and was released in the United States on June 16, 1998.

2000–2001: Aaron's Party (Come Get It), acting debut, and Oh Aaron
Carter's second studio album, Aaron's Party (Come Get It), was released in the United States on September 26, 2000, under the Jive label. The album sold more than three million copies in the United States and was certified 3× platinum by RIAA. The album included the hit singles, "I Want Candy", "Aaron's Party (Come Get It)", "That's How I Beat Shaq", and "Bounce", all of which received airplay on Disney Channel and Nickelodeon. He also made several guest appearances on Nickelodeon and performed as the opening act in several concerts for the Backstreet Boys and Britney Spears' Oops!... I Did It Again Tour.

In March 2001, he made his acting debut, guest starring on an episode of the Disney Channel series Lizzie McGuire. That same month, he and fellow teen star Samantha Mumba performed a concert in MGM Studios live on Disney Channel, titled Aaron Carter and Samantha Mumba in Concert. Carter's part of the concert was released to DVD that same month as Aaron's Party: Live in Concert. In April 2001, he made his Broadway debut, playing JoJo the Who in the musical Seussical.

At the age of 13, Carter recorded his third studio album Oh Aaron, which was released on August 7, 2001, and featured his first duet recording with his brother Nick, and a song with the group No Secrets. Play Along Toys created an Aaron Carter doll in conjunction with the album's release. Oh Aaron went platinum that same year and a live concert at Baton Rouge, Louisiana, was released to DVD as Oh Aaron: Live in Concert. His songs "Leave It Up to Me", "A.C.'s Alien Nation", and "Go Jimmy Jimmy" were used in the soundtrack for the 2001 film Jimmy Neutron: Boy Genius.

2002–2008: Another Earthquake, Most Requested Hits, Saturday Night and House of Carters

Carter's fourth studio album, Another Earthquake!, was released on September 3, 2002, during the Rock, Rap and Retro Tour. The album featured the patriotic-themed "America A.O." and the ballad "Do You Remember". He guest-starred on three episodes of the Nickelodeon television series All That and also sang "Through My Own Eyes", the theme song to the PBS animated series Liberty's Kids, alongside Kayla Hinkle.

In 2002, Carter's parents filed a lawsuit against his former manager Lou Pearlman, alleging failure to pay hundreds of thousands of dollars in royalties on Carter's 1998 album, which was released through Pearlman's label and production company Trans Continental. On March 13, 2003, Pearlman was declared in contempt of court for ignoring a court order to produce documents relating to royalty payments; however, the suit itself was settled out of court.

Carter's Most Requested Hits, a collection including tracks from his last three albums as well as a new single, "One Better", was released on November 3, 2003.

"Saturday Night" was released on March 22, 2005, and promoted by Carter that summer. The song was released by Trans Continental label, with Lou Pearlman as executive producer. The single was also featured in the soundtrack of the film Popstar, in which Carter starred. The direct-to-video film was based heavily on his own life as a performer. A real-life motocross racer, Carter also appeared in the 2005 film Supercross.

On March 21, 2006, Trans Continental filed a lawsuit against Carter with the Los Angeles County Superior Court, citing that Carter reneged on a recording deal. Carter signed the contract on December 7, 2004, when he was 17; his attorney argued that Carter had the right to "cancel or void various agreements" that were signed when he was a minor.

Carter and his siblings starred in a reality show, House of Carters, which ran from October to November 2006 on E!. The series featured all five Carter siblings reuniting to live in the same house.

2009–2013: Dancing with the Stars and return to touring

In 2009, Carter joined season 9 of Dancing with the Stars. He was partnered with Karina Smirnoff; they finished in fifth place. During this time he also released some music online, including the single "Dance with Me" featuring Flo Rida.

On January 23, 2011, Carter's manager Johnny Wright announced that Carter entered a treatment facility "to heal some emotional and spiritual issues he was dealing with." After entering the facility, Carter's first message to his fans was, "The main thing in life is not to be afraid of being human." On February 10, 2011, it was announced that Carter had successfully completed a month of rehab at the Betty Ford Center in Rancho Mirage, California.

On November 7, 2011, Carter began starring in the off-Broadway production of the world's longest running musical, The Fantasticks, at the Snapple Theater Center in New York City. Carter was cast in the role of Matt, the play's central character.

In January 2012, Carter was one of eight celebrities participating in the Food Network reality series Rachael vs. Guy: Celebrity Cook-Off. He was eliminated in the first episode.

In 2013, Carter kicked off his first tour in eight years, the After Party Tour. The tour ran from February to December 2013, and included over 150 shows in the United States and Canada.

2014–2022: The Music Never Stopped, Love and Blacklisted

In June 2014, Carter went on an 11-city Canadian tour during which he performed new songs from his upcoming album. Carter also announced that he would be embarking on a worldwide tour entitled the Wonderful World Tour, named for a song titled "Wonderful World" off of his upcoming album. The tour included 50 dates and ran from September 2014 until January 2015. In July, Carter appeared on Good Day L.A., where he performed "Ooh Wee", a single featuring Pat SoLo. In February 2015, Carter released an EP through SoundCloud titled The Music Never Stopped.

On January 31, 2016, Carter released his music video for "Curious" under the name Kid Carter, co-directed by MDM Media's Michael D. Monroe, Ben Epstein, and himself.

In April 2016, Carter released the single "Fool's Gold". Another single, "Sooner or Later", was released in January 2017. Both songs appeared on the EP Love, released in February 2017, written by Carter, Jon Asher, Melanie Fontana, Taylor "Lakestreet Louie" Helgeson, and Michel Schulz, produced and independently released by Carter on his new venture Rakkaus Records. An album of the same name was released as his fifth studio album on February 16, 2018.

Two days after Carter's death, his final album, Blacklisted, was released on all music platforms.

Personal life

Relationships
As a teenager, Carter dated several high-profile celebrities, including Hilary Duff and Lindsay Lohan. On September 17, 2006, at age 18, Carter became engaged to former beauty queen and Playboy model Kari Ann Peniche; he proposed to her on stage while performing at the Palms Casino Resort in Las Vegas. Carter broke off the engagement after six days, saying his decision to propose was impulsive. He began dating Madison Parker in 2016; they broke up in August 2017.

Carter came out as bisexual on August 5, 2017, through Twitter, and later that year on December 18, he made a guest appearance on the podcast LGBTQ&A to discuss both his career and sexuality. He reaffirmed his bisexuality publicly on at least one other occasion, but said all his past relationships were with women.

Carter had a son who was born November 22, 2021, with then-fiancée Melanie Martin.

Finances
According to the California Child Actor's Bill, Carter's parents were supposed to have put 15% of his earnings into a Coogan Account. Per Carter, "I got, like, $2 million when I turned 18 years old. I should have had at least $20 million in my account." After he turned 18 in 2005, Carter learned that he owed $4 million in tax liens. On November 22, 2013, Carter filed a bankruptcy petition to shed more than $3.5 million in debt, mostly taxes owed from the money made at the height of his popularity when he was a minor. The petition states that Carter owed the Internal Revenue Service $1.3 million in back taxes from his income in 2003. Carter claimed that his earnings had helped his parents to purchase 15 houses and 30 cars; however, he did not get any portion of profits when his parents sold the properties. He also claimed that his father shot a .44 Magnum near his ear, which caused him to go 70% deaf in one ear, in order to coerce him into signing a $256,000 check. Carter settled all of his tax debt in 2014.

In February 2019, Carter purchased a home in Lancaster, California.

In March 2020, Carter set up an OnlyFans account, which is popular in the adult entertainment industry, to make money. Carter began charging $50 to $100 per nude photo, or $26 a month. PinkNews stated "the prices are steep and the content is bizarre", while Queerty stated "The reviews of Aaron Carter's OnlyFans page are in and they're not good."

Health
In September 2017, Carter appeared on The Doctors, a syndicated health-focused talk show, to discuss public attention generated by his gaunt appearance and drug-related arrests. A series of tests revealed Carter did not have cancer or any sexually transmitted disease, but he did have a candida infection, which can be a sign of a weakened immune system. Carter tested negative for illegal drugs, but he tested positive for "a mixture of benzodiazepines with opiates", a potentially dangerous combination of prescription medications that Carter said he took for anxiety and sleep.

In 2019, Carter and his mother, Jane, appeared in the We TV reality series Marriage Bootcamp: Family Edition. The series focuses on attempting to repair strained relationships through unconventional therapy.

In a further appearance on The Doctors in 2019, Carter disclosed that he had been diagnosed with both schizophrenia and bipolar disorder.

Legal issues
On February 21, 2008, Carter was arrested in Kimble County, Texas, when he was pulled over for speeding, and authorities found less than two ounces of marijuana in his car.

On July 15, 2017, Carter was arrested in Georgia on suspicion of driving under the influence and marijuana charges. On October 19, 2021, Carter agreed to plead no contest to reckless driving and was placed on probation and, among other conditions, was ordered to perform community service and pay $1,500 in court fees and fines.

On August 12, 2019, Carter was granted a restraining order against his ex-girlfriend, Russian model Lina Valentina, after she reportedly threatened to stab him. On March 29, 2020, Carter's girlfriend Melanie Martin was arrested in Los Angeles following an alleged domestic violence incident against him.

Controversies
Carter had a tumultuous relationship with his siblings, and many of their feuds have played out on social media. In September 2019, Carter made allegations of sexual abuse against his sister Leslie, who died of a drug overdose in 2012, saying that the abuse began when he was ten years old and ended when he was 13, and occurred when Leslie would fail to take her prescribed medication for her bipolar disorder. He also accused his brother Nick of life-long abuse, and implied that Nick also abused a female family member. Nick's legal team denied the allegations, which came after Nick and their sister, Angel, sought restraining orders against Carter, who reportedly confessed that he had thoughts of killing Nick's then-pregnant wife, Lauren Carter.

In January 2020, German artist Jonas Jödicke tweeted that Carter was making unauthorized use of Jödicke's copyrighted artwork to promote merchandise. Carter replied on Twitter that Jödicke "should've taken it as a compliment". Following the incident, Jödicke was interviewed by Forbes, saying he was "absolutely amazed" at Carter's response. In June 2021, Carter agreed to pay Jödicke $12,500.

In August 2021, Carter was announced as a performer in the Las Vegas production of Naked Boys Singing!. He was let go before the show's debut because he refused to be vaccinated for COVID-19.

Death
On November 5, 2022, Carter died at his home in Lancaster, California, at age 34. His body was found in his bathtub by a housekeeper. An autopsy was performed but the cause of death was deferred, pending a toxicology report.

Carter was cremated on Wednesday, November 9, 2022. His ashes are being held by his twin sister, Angel. According to the death certificate, the first person to be notified of his death was his mother, Jane Schneck (formerly Carter).

Discography

Studio albums
 Aaron Carter (1997)
 Aaron's Party (Come Get It) (2000)
 Oh Aaron (2001)
 Another Earthquake! (2002)
 Love (2018)
 Blacklisted (2022)

Tours
Headlining
 Party Tour (2000–2001)
 Aaron's Winter Party (2002)
 Rock, Rap and Retro Tour (2002)
 Jukebox Tour (2003–2004)
 Remix Tour (2005)
 After Party Tour (2013)
 Aaron Carter's Wonderful World Tour (2014)

Co-headlining
 Kids Go Music Festival (1998) (with Take 5, No Authority, and 911)
 Kids Go Christmas Festival (1998) (with R&B)
 All That! Music and More Festival (1999) (with Monica, 98 Degrees, B*Witched, Tatyana Ali, 3rd Storee, and No Authority)
 Radio Disney Live! 2001 World Tour (2001) (with Krystal Harris, Hoku, Baha Men, Myra, True Vibe, Jump5, Brooke Allison, Plus One, Kaci, Play, and A-Teens)
 Pop 2000 Tour (2018–2020)

Opening act
 Backstreet Boys: Live In Concert Tour (1997) (Germany, Switzerland, Austria)
 Backstreet's Back Tour (1998) (United States, Canada)
 Oops!... I Did It Again Tour (2000) (England, Germany)

Promotional
 Eurasian Tour (1998)
 Australian Tour (2000)
 Wal-Mart Promo Tour (2000)

Filmography

Film

Television

References

External links

 

 
1987 births
2022 deaths
20th-century American singers
21st-century American male actors
21st-century American rappers
21st-century American singers
American child singers
Dance-pop musicians
Alternative R&B musicians
American male child actors
American male dancers
American male film actors
American male pop singers
American male rappers
American male singer-songwriters
American male television actors
American male voice actors
American twins
Bisexual male actors
Bisexual musicians
LGBT rappers
Child pop musicians
Jive Records artists
LGBT people from Florida
American LGBT singers
Male actors from Florida
Male actors from Tampa, Florida
Musicians from Tampa, Florida
Participants in American reality television series
People from Ruskin, Florida
Rappers from Florida
Singer-songwriters from Florida
20th-century American LGBT people
21st-century American LGBT people
OnlyFans creators
People with schizophrenia
Pop rappers
Fraternal twins